List of persons posing a threat to the national security of Ukraine, or the Black List of the Ministry of Culture of Ukraine is a list maintained by the Ministry of Culture of Ukraine and the Security Service of Ukraine is an on-going list of persons who pose a threat to national security of Ukraine, compiled by the Ministry of Culture of Ukraine on the basis of appeals from the Security Service of Ukraine, the National Security and Defense Council and/or the National Council for Television and Radio Broadcasting. Following the annexation of Crimea by Russia and the war in Donbas, the Ukrainian government has banned from entering Ukraine a number of Russian and international celebrities for publicly support of the annexation or for visiting Crimea in violation of the acting Ukrainian legislation.

History 
On July 8, 2015, radical activists of the "Otpor" (Ukrainian "Vidsich") movement held a theatrical action under the building of the Ministry of Culture of Ukraine demanding that any broadcast of films, songs, programs, shows and other content be banned. The young people handed over a list of 568 Russian artists and TV stars who, according to activists, should be banned. According to the Ministry of Culture of Ukraine, the list contained 567 people. On the same day, the Ministry of Culture of Ukraine sent to the Ministry of Foreign Affairs of Ukraine and the Security Service of Ukraine a list with updated data on 117 cultural figures of the Russian Federation who publicly supported the anti-Ukrainian military aggression in eastern Ukraine , the annexation of Crimeaand those who expressed objections about the state sovereignty and independence of Ukraine, on which it was proposed to apply restrictive measures in accordance with the law " On Sanctions ", adopted by the Verkhovna Rada of Ukraine in 2014.

Ratification of the List 
On August 7, 2015, the SBU provided the Ministry of Culture of Ukraine with a list of 14 people whose actions, according to the SBU, pose a threat to the national security of Ukraine. On August 8 of the same year, the Ministry of Culture of Ukraine published this list. Most of the people on this list have already been declared persona non grata in Ukraine. The following day, based on the list received, the Ministry created the formal list.

Selected individuals
The list has a confirmed 200 individuals as of 2023.

Individuals previously banned or refused entry

These individuals have at some point been banned from entering the Ukraine; these individuals are either deceased or have eventually been allowed entry.

See also
 List of individuals sanctioned during the Ukrainian crisis
 International sanctions during the Ukrainian crisis
 Boycott Russian Films

References

External links
 Российские звезды, которым запретили въезд на Украину в 2014-2019 годах [Russian stars banned from entering Ukraine in 2014 - 2019] - RIA Novosti, 25 July 2019

Immigration to Ukraine
Banned from entering the Ukraine
Ukraine
Ukraine
Sanctions and boycotts during the Russo-Ukrainian War
Sanctions against Russia
Ukraine-related lists